Anisa Zeb Tahirkheli is a Pakistani woman politician hailing from Haripur District. She is currently serving as member of the Khyber Pakhtunkhwa Assembly belong to the Qaumi Watan Party.

Education
Zeb got her degrees of BSc (Hons) in LLB and MSc in geology.

References

Living people
Pashtun women
Khyber Pakhtunkhwa MPAs 2013–2018
Women members of the Provincial Assembly of Khyber Pakhtunkhwa
People from Swabi District
Qaumi Watan Party politicians
Year of birth missing (living people)
21st-century Pakistani women politicians